The Sandakan Jamek Mosque ( or also known as Masjid Jamek Sheik Hasabollah At-Tohiri) is a mosque in Sandakan, Sabah, Malaysia. Opened in 1890, it is the oldest mosque in Sandakan, part of Sandakan Heritage Trail.

History 
The mosque was opened in 1890 by Damsah, a Muslim cloth merchant from British Raj (present-day India).  During World War II, the mosque become a hiding places for the town Muslim populations from the Japanese. The Japanese military believes the mosque could also become the hiding place for British soldiers that leading them to shot the mosque several times during the war.

See also 
 Islam in Malaysia

References

External links 
 

Mosques in Sabah
Mosques completed in 1890
1890 establishments in British Malaya
Mosque buildings with domes
Buildings and structures in Sandakan